Paul-Marie Masson (9 September 1882 – 27 January 1954) was a French musicologist, music teacher and composer. 

A specialist of the lyrical work of Jean-Philippe Rameau, in 1930 he published his thesis on L’Opéra de Rameau, which is still a reference work.

Masson has been president of the French association of musicologists Société française de musicologie (1944-1947).

References

External links 
 Paul-Marie Masson on Encyclopédie Larousse
 « Les musicologues français face à Vichy. Le cas Paul-Marie Masson »

20th-century French composers
20th-century French musicologists
1882 births
People from Sète
1954 deaths
Officiers of the Légion d'honneur
Presidents of the Société française de musicologie